The Dutch Amateur Championship is an annual snooker competition played in the Netherlands and is the highest ranking amateur event in the Netherlands.

The competition was established in 1987, and was won by René Dikstra who would go on to win four of the first five championships.

Winners

Stats

Finalists

References 

Snooker amateur competitions
Snooker in the Netherlands
Recurring sporting events established in 1987
1987 establishments in the Netherlands